The 2008-09 Libyan Trophy, known as the Libyana Cup for sponsorship reasons, was contested between the sixteen sides playing in the 2008-09 Libyan Premier League. It is the second edition of the competition.

Rules

This is a competition aimed at under-21 players. However, each club is permitted to enter three members of its senior side, as long as they are not foreign players. The 16 clubs will be split into three groups, depending on their geographic location. The sides in each group will play each other once. The winner of each group will enter a Championship Group. The three sides in this group will play each other home and away to determine the title.

Prizes
 Winner - LYD 100,000
 2nd Place - LYD 50,000
 3rd Place- LYD 25,000

Draw
The draw was made by the Libyan Football Federation on Wednesday, February 25, 2009 in Benghazi.
The 16 sides in the Libyan Premier League for the 2008-09 season were drawn into three groups, two of 5 and one group of 6. They were sorted according to geographic location.

Group A (Eastern Section)

Fixtures
Week 1

Week 2

Week 3

Week 4

Week 5

Group B (Western Section A)

Fixtures
Week 1

Week 2

---
Week 3

Tersana vs. Madina
Ittihad vs. Wefaq

Week 4
Jazeera vs. Madina
Wahda vs. Wefaq
Tersana vs. Ittihad

Week 5
Jazeera vs. Wefaq
Madina vs. Ittihad
Wahda vs. Tersana

Group C (Western Section B)

Week 1

Week 2
Aman al Aam vs. Ahly Tripoli
Sweahly vs. Olomby

Week 3
Shat vs. Olomby
Aman al Aam vs. Sweahly

Week 4
Ahly Tripoli vs. Sweahly
Shat vs. Aman al Aam

Week 5
Olomby vs. Aman al Aam
Ahly Tripoli vs. Shat

Final stage
Khaleej Sirte, Aman al Aam and Ittihad Tripoli qualified from the groups

Fixtures & Results
 13-07-09 : Ittihad 3 - 1 Khaleej Sirte
 16-07-09 : Khaleej Sirte 1 - 3 Aman al Aam
 19-07-09 : Aman al Aam 0 - 1 Ittihad
 23-07-09 : Khaleej Sirte 3 - 2 Ittihad
 26-07-09 : Aman al Aam 2 - 0 Khaleej Sirte
 29-07-09 : Ittihad 5 - 0 Aman al Aam

 1.Ittihad		 4  3  0  1  11 -  4  9  Champions
 2.Aman al Aam	         4  2  0  2   5 -  7  6
 3.Khaleej Strt          4  1  0  3   5 - 10  3

References

Trophy